The phonology of the Zuni language as spoken in the southwestern United States is described here. Phonology is a branch of linguistics that studies how languages or dialects systematically organize their sounds (or constituent parts of signs, in sign languages).

Consonants
The 16 consonants of Zuni:

  is dental;  are alveolar;  is apical.
  are phonetically aspirated, while  are unaspirated.
 A sequence of a stop or affricate and a glottal stop  is phonetically realized as an ejective. Some analyses have proposed that the sequences  be considered single ejective consonant phonemes  based on their phonotactic properties.
This neutralization of contrast also applies to the sequences .
  are palatal  before the vowels , but are velar elsewhere. Since  is realized as an ejective before a glottal stop, the sequences  are phonetically .
 In a sequence of a stop or affricate plus another consonant (except ), the stop/affricate has no audible release. That is,  ('elbow') is phonetically  and not .
 All Zuni consonants occur with contrastive duration: short or long. In Stanley Newman's analysis, the phonetically long consonants are geminates (that is, a sequence of two identical consonants) . analyze length  as a separate phoneme.
  is phonetically a voiceless vowel , except when following a consonant in which case it is a velar fricative :  ('pick it up!') is phonetically .
The devoicing occurs within words and across word boundaries. This is especially common when also preceded by a voiceless consonant (in addition to the following ):  ('thus perhaps') pronounced .
  is optionally realized as a phonetic velar  before .
 There is a marginal contrast between palatal  and velar  before the low vowel . The usual pronunciation of  before  is palatal . However, in some words — all of which are probably loanwords — a velar  occurs before  (notably in the very common word,  ('non-Mormon Anglo-American'), which is phonetically  and not ).

Vowels

 High  are typically , but lowered variants  may be heard in unstressed syllables.
 Mid  are typically , but in unstressed syllables raised variants occur before glides with matching backness:  before ,  before .
 Low central , unlike the other vowels, is not reported to have allophonic variation by Newman. However , reports its realization as fronted  when it follows .
 All vowels occur with contrastive duration: short or long. In Newman's analysis, the phonetically long vowels are analyzed as distinct phonemes . analyzes length  as a separate phoneme.
 Long  are typically , but close variants  can occur in fast speech.
 The other long vowels do not have variants with differing vowel quality.

Syllable and phonotactics
Zuni syllables have the following specification:

 C1(C2)V(ː)(C3)(C4)

That is, all syllables must start with a consonant in the syllable onset. The onset may optionally have two consonants. The syllable coda is optional and may consist of a single consonant or two consonants. There are restrictions on the combinations with long vowels, which are listed below.

Onset. When the onset is a single consonant (i.e., CV(ː), CV(ː)C, or CV(ː)CC), C1 may be any consonant. When the onset is a two consonant cluster (i.e., CCV(ː), CCV(ː)C, or CCV(ː)CC), C1 may only be , and C2 may only be . These onset clusters can occur word-initially.

Nucleus. Any vowel of either length may be the syllable nucleus when open (i.e., has no coda: CV(ː) or CCV(ː)) or with a single consonant coda (i.e., CV(ː)C or CCV(ː)C).

Coda. A single coda C3 may be any consonant.

Non-tautosyllabic combinations. Inside words, a short vowel plus a two consonant coda (i.e., CVCC or CCVCC) may only be followed by a syllable with a  onset. Likewise, a long vowel plus a single consonant coda (i.e., CVːC or CCVːC) may only be followed by a  onset. An open syllable (i.e., CV(ː) or CCV(ː)) and a short vowel plus a single consonant coda (i.e., CVC or CCVC) may be followed by a syllable with any possible onset.

Prosody

At the word level, the first syllable of lexical words receive stress. Although the acoustic correlates of stress are not fully described in Newman's grammar, at least vowel length is a significant correlate: short vowels are lengthened under syllable-initial stress. Stressed long vowels do not appear to have perceptible variation in duration.

Stress at the phrase level was not fully studied by Newman, and, therefore, its details are not well known. Pronouns and certain particles consisting of a single syllable are unstressed when inside clauses, but are stressed at the beginning of phrases.

Notes

Bibliography

Further reading

Languages articles needing expert attention
Native American phonologies
Native American tribes in New Mexico
Pueblo culture
Zuni culture
Zuni tribe